Jotindra Lal Tripura (born 28 July 1947) is a Bangladeshi politician, belonging to the Awami League. Tripura is the Khagrachhari District president of the Awami League. In the December 2008 election Tripura was elected as a Member of Parliament from the Parbattya Khagrachhari constituency, with 122,750 votes (43.9%). He did not stand again in the 2014 elections.

References

Living people
Tripuri people
Bangladeshi Hindus
Awami League politicians
People from Khagrachhari District
9th Jatiya Sangsad members
1947 births